St. John Detroit Riverview Hospital was a hospital controlled by the St. John Health System. It was located on Jefferson Avenue on the east side of Detroit, near Belle Isle.

History

Prior to the hospital's 2007 closure, 30,000 patients used the emergency department each year.

In April 2007, the Barbara Ann Karmanos Cancer Institute announced plans to buy the Riverview hospital facility. The institute planned to move all of its clinical operations to the Riverview facility within 18 months and cancel existing plans to build a 122-person cancer hospital in the Detroit Medical Center.

The St. John Riverview Hospital was unprofitable for the hospital system. The healthcare system planned to close the hospital by the end of June 2007. Clergy and medical leaders and the union representing the workers protested the proposed closure, arguing that the closure would cause hundreds of people to lose their jobs and hinder healthcare access for thousands of area residents. In May 2007 officials from the hospital area union leaders, and area religious leaders were scheduled to meet officials from the Detroit City Council to discuss what would happen if the hospital closed. That year, the St. John Riverview Hospital closed. The emergency room services remained open as the health provider reviewed plans for the campus.

In 2009 Oakland University (OU) announced plans to install a health care worker training center at St. John Riverview.

In 2011 the St. John Providence Health System sold the Riverview Hospital and the St. John Senior Community Center, also in Detroit, to DRSN, an investment group.

References

External links

 St. John Detroit Riverview Hospital (Archive)

Hospitals in Detroit
2007 disestablishments in Michigan